Li Wenxiang, sometimes mistransliterated Li Wenxian and also known as the Guangzhou Ripper, was a Chinese serial killer who was active 1991–1996 in Guangzhou, China. He killed 13 people.

References

1952 births
Chinese people convicted of murder
Chinese people convicted of rape
Chinese rapists
Chinese serial killers
Living people